The 2010 Singapore League Cup was held between 20 February to 7 March. The draw was held on Tuesday, 9 February 2010 in Singapore. The matches are played on a one match basis.

Bracket

Preliminary stage
The winners advance to the quarter-final stage.

Quarter-final stage
The winners advance to the semi-final stage.

Semi-final stage
The winners advance to the Final, while the losers contest for 3rd-place.

3rd-place playoff

Final

See also
 S.League
 Singapore Cup
 Singapore Charity Shield
 Football Association of Singapore
 List of football clubs in Singapore

References

February 2010 sports events in Asia
2010
League Cup
2010 domestic association football cups
March 2010 sports events in Asia